Parmenopsis caucasica is a species of beetle in the family Cerambycidae, and the only species in the genus Parmenopsis. It was described by Leder in 1879.

References

Parmenini
Beetles described in 1879